Amaurodon is a genus of fungi in the family Thelephoraceae. Most species in the genus have resupinate and corticioid (flattened, crust-like) fruit bodies that grow on rotting wood. The hymenophore may have pores, teeth, or be smooth, and is typically blue to green in color.

Species
The following is a list of species in this genus and their associated synonyms (=).

 Amaurodon aeruginascens (Hjortstam & Ryvarden) Kõljalg & K.H.Larss. 1996 – South America
= Tomentellago aeruginascens Hjortstam & Ryvarden
 Amaurodon angulisporus Gardt & Yorou 2011 – West Africa
 Amaurodon aquicoeruleus Agerer 2001 – Western Australia
 Amaurodon atrocyaneus (Wakef.) Kõljalg & K.H.Larss. 1996 – United Kingdom; Venezuela
= Pseudotomentella atrocyanea (Wakef.) Burds. & M.J. Larsen
= Tomentella atrocyanea Wakef.
 Amaurodon caeruleocaseus Svantesson & T.W. May 2021 – Australia
 Amaurodon cyaneus (Wakef.) Kõljalg & K.H.Larss. 1996 – United Kingdom
= Hypochnus cyaneus Wakef.
= Lazulinospora cyanea (Wakef.) Burds. & M.J. Larsen
= Pseudotomentella cyanea (Wakef.) Svrček
= Tomentella cyanea (Wakef.) Bourdot & Galzin
 Amaurodon hydnoides  Kõljalg & Ryvarden 1997 – Venezuela
 Amaurodon mustialaensis (P.Karst.) Kõljalg & K.H.Larss. 1996 – Europe
= Coniophora mustialaensis (P. Karst.) Massee
= Corticium mustialaense (P. Karst.) Fr.
= Hypochnopsis mustialaensis (P. Karst.) P. Karst.
= Hypochnus mustialaensis P. Karst. [as  'mustialaënsis' ]
= Lyomyces mustialaensis (P. Karst.) P. Karst.
 Amaurodon sumatranus Miettinen & Kõljalg 2007 – Indonesia
 Amaurodon viridis (Alb. & Schwein.) J.Schröt. 1888 – Europe; Australia – type species
= Acia viridis (Alb. & Schwein.) P. Karst.
= Caldesiella viridis (Alb. & Schwein.) Pat.
= Hydnum viride (Alb. & Schwein.) Fr.
= Hydnum viride var. psittacinum Pers.
= Hydnum viride var. riograndense Rick, in Rambo (Ed.)
= Hypochnus chlorinus Massee
= Odontia viridis (Alb. & Schwein.) Quél.
= Sistotrema viride Alb. & Schwein.
= Tomentella chlorina (Massee) G. Cunn.
 Amaurodon wakefieldiae (Burds. & M.J.Larsen) Kõljalg & K.H.Larss. 1996 – United States
= Lazulinospora wakefieldiae Burds. & M.J. Larsen [as  'wakefieldii' ]
= Tomentella wakefieldiae (Burds. & M.J. Larsen) Stalpers

See also

References

External links

 

Thelephorales
Thelephorales genera
Taxa described in 1888